The Orange Line is an  light rail line in the San Diego Trolley system, operated by San Diego Trolley, Inc. an operating division of the San Diego Metropolitan Transit System. The route connects Downtown San Diego with the cities of Lemon Grove, La Mesa, and El Cajon. The Orange Line has the lowest ridership of the San Diego Trolley's three regular lines, transporting 10,896,289 riders during FY 2014 according to the MTS.

It is one of four lines in the Trolley system, the others include the Blue, Green and Silver lines.

At night, the San Diego and Imperial Valley Railroad uses the Orange Line right of way east of the rail yard near the 12th & Imperial Transit Center for its freight service to El Cajon and Santee.

History

The Orange Line is the second line in the San Diego Trolley system.  Service began on March 23, 1986, originally as the East Line and initially operated between downtown San Diego and Euclid Avenue.  The East Line, as it was then called, kept this name after successive extensions to Spring Street on May 12, 1989, to the El Cajon Transit Center on June 23, 1989, along the Bayside in downtown San Diego on June 30, 1990, and finally to Santee Town Center on August 26, 1995.

The line was renamed the Orange Line in 1997. Service between Gillespie Field and Santee Town Center was replaced by the Green Line in July 2005 upon that line's introduction.

2012 realignment
During a system redesign on September 2, 2012, the Orange Line's eastern terminus was further shortened to the El Cajon Transit Center, while Orange Line service along the Bayside was eliminated and its western terminus was rerouted to the Santa Fe Depot in downtown San Diego.

Trolley Renewal Project

To accommodate the new Siemens S70 models so that they could be used on the line, Trolley stations needed to undergo renovation, although this was done over a period of time to prevent the disruption of operation. The new S70 models began operation on the Orange Line in January 2013, once all remaining Orange Line stations had been upgraded to handle them, and all renovation work on the Orange Line was completed in 2013.

2017 and 2018 realignment
On July 11, 2017, the Orange Line was once again realigned to terminate at America Plaza instead of Santa Fe Depot. MTS says the change should help improve on-time performance of the Orange Line and relieve train congestion at Santa Fe Depot.

In order to alleviate train congestion at America Plaza in preparation for the Mid-Coast trolley extension to University City, MTS constructed a new station, Courthouse, which serves as the new western terminus for the Orange Line. Courthouse station is a single platform station located on C street between State and Union. The station opened April 29, 2018.  The line was also re-extended north one station at this time to service Arnele Avenue.

Stations

Future
In January 2013, San Diego Mayor Bob Filner and SANDAG conducted talks about a possible trolley extension to San Diego International Airport. SANDAG has been conducting feasibility studies on an extension to Lindbergh Field since 2009. There are many different plans and scenarios for such an extension, but one of the possible scenarios is to extend the Orange Line from downtown San Diego up N. Harbor Drive to the passenger terminals on the south side of Lindbergh Field, with possible stops along the way. Currently, there is no projected start or completion date for such a proposed extension of the Orange Line to Lindbergh Field.

References

 
San Diego Trolley lines
El Cajon, California
La Mesa, California
Railway lines opened in 1986
1986 establishments in California